The 2021 Jurassic X-Prix was an Extreme E off-road race that was held on 18 and 19 December 2021 at Bovington Camp, in Dorset, England. It was the fifth and last round of the electric off-road racing car series' inaugural season. A significant rule adjustment was introduced for the event to accommodate the short nature of the circuit, each session now consisting of three laps, with the starting driver, who in the final would be the female driver, taking the first two.

The final was won by Cristina Gutiérrez and Sébastien Loeb for Team X44, ahead of JBXE and Andretti United Extreme E. Rosberg X Racing's Johan Kristoffersson and Molly Taylor came fourth to seal both the drivers' and the teams' championship.

Classification

Qualifying

Notes:
 Tie-breakers were determined by Super Sector times.

Semi-final 1

Notes:
  – Team awarded 5 additional points for being fastest in the Super Sector.

Semi-final 2

Crazy Race

Final

References

External links
 

|- style="text-align:center"
|width="35%"|Previous race:2021 Island X-Prix
|width="30%"|Extreme E Championship2021 season
|width="35%"|Next race:2022 Desert X-Prix
|- style="text-align:center"
|width="35%"|Previous race:N/A
|width="30%"|Jurassic X-Prix
|width="35%"|Next race:N/A
|- style="text-align:center"

Jurassic X-Prix
Jurassic X-Prix
Jurassic X-Prix